Ohlin Harrison Adsit (August 1855 – August 8, 1909) was an Alaskan broker and politician, including Mayor of Juneau, Alaska from 1902 to 1904.

Biography
He was born in August 1855 in New York. Adsit came to Alaska, originally seeking success from the Klondike Gold Rush of the late 1890s. 

He was the plaintiff in Malony v. Adsit, a United States Supreme Court case involving a tract of land in the townsite of Juneau.   The case, originally tried before judge Arthur K. Delaney (who would later precede Adsit as mayor of Juneau) on August 10, 1897, was in favor of Adsit.  The appeal, however, eventually brought the case to the Supreme Court.

Adsit visited Portland, Oregon in 1901.

He was Mayor of Juneau, Alaska from 1902 to 1904.

He died on August 8, 1909, in Seattle, Washington. He was buried in Lake View Cemetery.

References

External links
 

1855 births
1909 deaths
Mayors of Juneau, Alaska
19th-century American businesspeople